Martin Løken (26 June 1863 – 22 April 1942) was a Norwegian politician for the Liberal Party.

He served as a deputy representative to the Norwegian Parliament during the term 1907–1909. In 1908 and 1909 he took a regular seat, covering for Nils Claus Ihlen who was a member of the first cabinet Knudsen.

On the local level he was a member of Ullensaker municipal council from 1896, and served as mayor from 1901 to 1907.

He worked as a farmer in Ullensaker. In addition he served on local public committees, chairing the school board from 1910 to 1911.

References

Liberal Party (Norway) politicians
1863 births
1942 deaths
People from Ullensaker
Members of the Storting
Mayors of places in Akershus